NGC 4516 is a barred spiral galaxy located about 55 million light-years away in the constellation Coma Berenices.  NGC 4516 was discovered by astronomer William Herschel on April 8, 1784. NGC 4516 is a member of the Virgo Cluster.

See also
 List of NGC objects (4001–5000)
 NGC 4440

References

External links

Coma Berenices
Barred spiral galaxies
4516
41661
7703
Astronomical objects discovered in 1784
Virgo Cluster
Discoveries by William Herschel